Wicked Grin is the twenty-eighth studio album from blues singer John P. Hammond. The album is a collection of songs written by Hammond's friend Tom Waits, who produced the project.  It was released in March 2001 under Pointblank Records.

Track listing

Personnel
John P. Hammond - vocals, guitar; acoustic slide guitar and harmonica" on "Buzz Fledderjohn"
Tom Waits - guitar; plucked piano on "Buzz Fledderjohn"; piano on "Fannin Street"
Larry Taylor - bass
Augie Meyers - piano, Hammond organ, Wurlitzer, Vox organ, accordion
Stephen Hodges - drums, percussion
Charlie Musselwhite - harmonica

Critical reception
Q listed Wicked Grin as one of the best 50 albums of 2001.

Charts

References

2001 albums
Virgin Records albums
Tom Waits tribute albums
John P. Hammond albums